Silas Katompa Mvumpa (born 6 October 1998), known simply as Silas and formerly as Silas Wamangituka Fundu, is a Congolese professional footballer who plays as a forward for Bundesliga club VfB Stuttgart and the  DR Congo national team.

Career

Early career
Silas began playing football in Kinshasa, DR Congo with his local club Olympic Matete FC. At the age of 17, his performances earned him a move to Alès in France, and after his debut season, he moved to Paris FC in the Ligue 2. Silas made his professional debut for Paris FC in a 2–0 win over Troyes on 31 August 2018. On 11 September 2018, he signed his first professional contract with the club for three years.

VfB Stuttgart
On 13 August 2019, Silas signed a five-year deal with German club VfB Stuttgart. He played a big part in Stuttgart's promotion to the Bundesliga in the 2019–20 season, scoring 7 league goals.

Identity

On 8 June 2021, VfB Stuttgart released a statement that revealed that Silas's real name is actually Silas Katompa Mvumpa, and not Silas Wamangituka Fundu as previously thought. Stuttgart believed that Silas's agent had altered Mvumpa's identity to increase the player's dependence on the agent. Furthermore, Silas was revealed to be one year older, with his actual birth year being 1998. He stated that a new agent and club helped him gain the confidence to reveal these details, after having had them held against him as a threat by his previous agent; Stuttgart did not expect any sanctions against the club and player. However, on 11 June, Silas was fined €30,000 and banned for three months by the German Football Association.

Career statistics

Honours
Individual

Bundesliga Rookie of the Season: 2020–21
 Bundesliga Rookie of the Month: November 2020, December 2020, February 2021

References

External links

 
 
 
 Paris FC Profile

1998 births
Living people
Footballers from Kinshasa
Democratic Republic of the Congo footballers
Association football forwards
Paris FC players
Olympique Alès players
VfB Stuttgart players
Ligue 2 players
Championnat National 3 players
Bundesliga players
2. Bundesliga players
Democratic Republic of the Congo expatriate footballers
Democratic Republic of the Congo expatriate sportspeople in France
Expatriate footballers in France
Expatriate footballers in Germany